The 1981 Cadet World Championship was held in Buenos Aires, Argentina between 27 December 1981 and 2 January 1982.

Podium

1981 in sailing
Sailing competitions in Argentina
Sports competitions in Buenos Aires
Cadet World Championships